Pure Gold is a compilation album that reached number 1 in the UK. It was released by EMI and is alternatively known as Pure Gold on EMI. It was the label's first excursion into the world of TV-advertised compilations which had exploded with the recent arrival of K-Tel, Ronco and Arcade in the UK, although they would not explore this area consistently until the EMTV series launched in 1976.

Track listing
T. Rex – Solid Gold Easy Action
Jackson 5 – Lookin' Through the Windows
Mud – Crazy
Bruce Ruffin – Mad About You
Diana Ross – Doobedood'ndoobe, Doobedood'ndoobe, Doobedood'ndoo
Wizzard – Ball Park Incident
Blue Mink – Stay With Me
Cliff Richard – Living in Harmony
Stevie Wonder – Heaven Help Us All
Geordie – All Because of You
Cliff Richard – Power to All Our Friends
The Temptations – Psychedelic Shack
Hurricane Smith – Who Was It?
T. Rex – 20th Century Boy
Cilla Black – Step Inside Love
Electric Light Orchestra – Roll Over Beethoven
Four Tops – Keeper of the Castle
New World – Sister Jane
Deep Purple – Strange Kind of Woman
Kenny – Heart of Stone

References

1973 compilation albums
EMI Records compilation albums